Halvor Bjellaanes (19 June 1925 – 7 October 2010) was a Norwegian officer, bank manager, and politician for the Liberal Party between the years 1965 and 1969.

Political Career 
Bjellaanes was involved in local politics in Korgen and Vefsn between the years 1959 and 1963. He was elected to the Norwegian Parliament from Nordland in 1965 for one term, losing re-election in 1969.

References 

1925 births
2010 deaths
20th-century Norwegian politicians
Liberal Party (Norway) politicians
Members of the Storting
Nordland politicians
People from Mo i Rana